Anthony Emmanuel O. “Tony” Mmoh (born 14 June 1958 in Enugu) is a former tennis player from Nigeria, who represented his native country at the 1988 Summer Olympics in Seoul, where he was defeated in the second round by the Netherlands' wild card entry Michiel Schapers. The right-hander reached his highest singles ATP-ranking on 19 October 1987, when he became the number 105 of the world. His son Michael Mmoh is also a tennis player.

References

External links
 
 

1958 births
Living people
Sportspeople from Enugu
Nigerian male tennis players
Tennis players at the 1988 Summer Olympics
Olympic tennis players of Nigeria
Igbo sportspeople
African Games medalists in tennis
African Games silver medalists for Nigeria
Competitors at the 1978 All-Africa Games
20th-century Nigerian people